Alfonso Pérez Noya (died 1366) was a Roman Catholic prelate who served as Bishop of Ourense (1361–1366).

Biography
On 23 August 1361, Alfonso Pérez Noya was appointed during the papacy of Pope Innocent VI as Bishop of Ourense. In February 1362, he was consecrated bishop by Blas Fernández de Toledo, Archbishop of Toledo. He served as Bishop of Orense until his death in 1366.

References

External links and additional sources
 (for Chronology of Bishops) 
 (for Chronology of Bishops) 

14th-century Roman Catholic bishops in Castile
1366 deaths
Bishops appointed by Pope Innocent VI